Echo Bank (also known as Endeavour Bank) is an underwater mountain, part of Canary Islands Seamount Province and located southwest of the Canary Islands. It has a flat top, indicating that it formerly might have emerged from the sea.

Name 

The etymology of "Echo Bank" is unknown but it is also known as Endeavour Bank and the name "Echo Bank" might refer to a submarine feature discovered in 1925-1927 and so named after its reflective crest. "Echo Bank" is also the name of an unconfirmed seamount south of the Sargasso Sea.

Geography and geomorphology

Regional 

Echo Bank is part of the Canary Islands Seamount Province (CISP), which reaches from north of Lanzarote in the Canary Islands to southwest of the archipelago. This province aside from Echo Bank includes Tropic Seamount, The Paps Seamount, Ico Seamount and Drago Seamount but also Essaouira Seamount north of Lanzarote. Especially the southern among these underwater mountains are poorly studied; together with the Canary Islands proper they form an important volcanic province in the Atlantic Ocean. Aside from the seamounts, submarine canyons and large debris flows occur in the region such as the Sahara Slide which has run around Echo Bank.

Local 

There are small depressions on the topi. Volcanic cones which reach depths of  cluster in the central summit platform. Around the summit lie terraces and scarps, with the terraces particularly pronounced on the eastern side while the western side has only two. This may reflect a slight tilt of the seamount.

The San Borondón ridge connects the two seamounts. Northeast from Echo Bank lies first Hierro Seamount and then the island of El Hierro.

Geology 

The geological origin of the Canary Islands Seamounts are unclear, with various hotspot processes as well as crustal and mantle phenomena proposed. Volcanic activity at Echo and Tropic seamounts was probably focused and generated a circular volcanic structure, while at Drago and The Paps it was controlled by lineaments and thus formed elongated edifices.

Composition 

Dredging at Echo Bank has yielded basaltic lapillistones, carbonates, coral debris, intermediate volcanic rocks, limestone of hemipelagic origin, manganese crusts, sandstone of volcanic and calcarenite origin and vesicular basalt. The volcanic rocks at the Canary Islands seamounts like those of the Canary Islands are classified as alkalic; the basaltic rocks contain clinopyroxene while the rare intermediary volcanic rocks contain amphibole.

Dredged samples of the ferromanganese crusts consist mainly of goethite and manganese dioxide and minor amounts of calcite, phyllosilicate and quartz.

Environment 

A number of separate water masses surround Echo Bank, which originate from regions such as the North Atlantic, the South Atlantic and Antarctica and are stacked over each other. In general, the region is under the influence of the nutrient-poor waters of the subtropical gyre and the upwelling regions off northwestern Africa.

Bottom net trawlings of Echo Bank have revealed remarkable findings such as a rich decapod fauna. African cuttlefish, the barnacle Poecilasma aurantia, the common cuttlefish, the elegant cuttlefish and the giant African cuttlefish occur at Echo Bank; the giant African cuttlefish is the most commercially important cuttlefish in the region. In addition, the bobtail squids Rossia and Sepiola and the ram's horn squid have been found at Echo Bank. Shoals of fish were frequently observed on the seamount. In 1960–1970, snapper fisheries at Echo Bank were replaced by cephalopod fisheries.

Geologic history 

The flat top of Echo Bank has been interpreted as having formed during subaerial erosion, implying that the seamount was once an island although the evidence for such is less clear than at Tropic Seamount and alternative explanations for the flat summit exist. Echo Bank is currently undergoing sedimentation and it appears to be volcanically inactive. There is evidence of recent landsliding, however, and cone-shaped topographic anomalies could indicate recent volcanism. One of these landslides may have occurred between 339,000 and 869,000 years ago.

References

Sources 

 
 
 
 
 
 
 
 
 

Canary Islands
Seamounts of the Atlantic Ocean